Jakob Karl Heinrich Wilhelm Tiedtke (23 June 1875 – 30 June 1960) was a German film actor. He appeared in more than 190 films between 1914 and 1955.

Selected filmography

 The Pied Piper of Hamelin (1918)
 The Doll (1919)
 The Galley Slave (1919)
 A Drive into the Blue (1919)
 Kohlhiesel's Daughters (1920)
 Sumurun (1920)
 Romeo and Juliet in the Snow (1920)
 Kohlhiesels Töchter (1920)
 Love at the Wheel (1921)
 Peter Voss, Thief of Millions (1921)
 The Stream (1922)
 Sins of Yesterday (1922)
 Maciste and the Chinese Chest (1923)
 The Expulsion (1923)
 The Ancient Law (1923)
 The Little Napoleon (1923)
 Carousel (1923)
 The Flame (1923)
 The Merchant of Venice (1923)
 Tragedy in the House of Habsburg (1924)
 Nanon (1924)
 Doctor Wislizenus (1924)
 Arabella (1924)
 Playing with Destiny (1924)
 By Order of Pompadour (1924)
 The Woman from Berlin (1925)
 Three Waiting Maids (1925)
 Hussar Fever (1925)
 A Waltz Dream (1925)
 Peter the Pirate (1925)
 Chamber Music (1925)
 The Mill at Sanssouci (1926)
 The Good Reputation (1926)
 The Man in the Fire  (1926)
 The Armoured Vault (1926)
 We'll Meet Again in the Heimat (1926)
 The Uncle from the Provinces (1926)
 Only a Dancing Girl (1926)
 Nameless Woman (1927)
 Excluded from the Public (1927)
 The Transformation of Dr. Bessel (1927)
 Luther (1928)
 You Walk So Softly (1928)
 When the Guard Marches (1928)
 Mariett Dances Today (1928)
  Don Juan in a Girls' School (1928)
 The Lady from Argentina (1928)
 Give Me Life (1928)
 Strauss Is Playing Today (1928)
 Dear Homeland (1929)
 The Love of the Brothers Rott (1929)
 My Sister and I (1929)
 Pension Schöller (1930)
 Yorck (1931)
 That's All That Matters (1931)
 Inquest (1931)
 Berlin-Alexanderplatz (1931)
 The Golden Anchor (1932)
 My Friend the Millionaire (1932)
 Spoiling the Game (1932)
 Viennese Waltz (1932)
 A Mad Idea (1932)
 The Blue of Heaven (1932)
 The Testament of Cornelius Gulden (1932)
 An Auto and No Money (1932)
 Happy Days in Aranjuez (1933)
 Season in Cairo (1933)
 A Thousand for One Night (1933)
 Little Man, What Now? (1933)
 Idylle au Caire (1933)
 Gretel Wins First Prize (1933)
 The Sandwich Girl (1933)
 Count Woronzeff (1934)
 Love and the First Railway (1934)
 The Flower Girl from the Grand Hotel (1934)
 The Double (1934)
 The Sun Rises (1934)
 Bashful Felix (1934)
 Decoy (1934)
 Love Conquers All (1934)
 The Double Fiance (1934)
 The Cousin from Nowhere (1934)
 Such a Rascal (1934)
 The Young Count (1935)
 Fresh Wind from Canada (1935)
  The Bird Seller (1935)
Peter, Paul and Nanette (1935)
 Game on Board (1936)
 Savoy Hotel 217 (1936)
 Uncle Bräsig (1936)
 The Divine Jetta (1937)
 To New Shores (1937)
 So You Don't Know Korff Yet? (1938)
 The Immortal Heart (1939)
 The Journey to Tilsit (1939)
 Robert Koch (1939)
 Jud Süß (1940)
 Counterfeiters (1940)
 The Swedish Nightingale (1941)
 The Buchholz Family (1944)
 Viennese Girls (1945)
 Chemistry and Love (1948)
 Hanna Amon (1948)
 Everything Will Be Better in the Morning (1948)
 Nothing But Coincidence (1949) 
 Hanna Amon (1951)
 Queen of the Night (1951)
 At the Well in Front of the Gate (1952)
 Not Afraid of Big Animals (1953)
  The Blue Hour (1953)
 Lady's Choice (1953)
 Love is Forever (1954)
  Emil and the Detectives (1954)

References

External links
 

1875 births
1960 deaths
German male film actors
German male silent film actors
Male actors from Berlin
Officers Crosses of the Order of Merit of the Federal Republic of Germany
20th-century German male actors